An election was held on 4 May 1995 to elect all 34 members of the North Warwickshire Borough Council in England. It resulted in the Labour Party retaining control of the council.

This election saw Labour making significant gains, winning nine more seats than the last election from eight Conservative councillors and an independent. The Conservatives only retained four of the twelve seats they held. An independent also retained their seat.

References

1995 English local elections
1995
20th century in Warwickshire